Kaarel Tarand (born 20 September 1966) is an Estonian journalist and editor.

He was born in Tallinn to geographer, climatologist and politician Andres Tarand and radio journalist Mari Tarand. His older brother is politician Indrek Tarand. During 1987–1996 he studied philology and social sciences at the University of Tartu.

In 1996–1999, he was the editor of magazine Luup. Since 2002, he has worked as a columnist at newspaper Eesti Päevaleht. Since 2005, he has been a chief editor of newspaper Sirp.

References

Living people
1966 births
Estonian journalists
Estonian editors
University of Tartu alumni
People from Tallinn